Sprakers is a hamlet in the town of Root, Montgomery County, New York, United States. Its ZIP Code is 12166.

Notable people
 Stewart Friesen, race car driver
 George A. Mitchell, founder of Cadillac, Michigan

Notes

Hamlets in New York (state)
Hamlets in Montgomery County, New York
Populated places on the Mohawk River